Maurice Blik (born 21 April 1939) is a British sculptor and past President of the Royal British Society of Sculptors. He is known for his figurative male sculpture.

Early life 
Born in Amsterdam, The Netherlands, much of his work is influenced by his experience of being interned in Belsen concentration camp as a young child. The story of his life and work was featured in The Times newspaper ‘Igniting the Spark’, 30/09/2005

Career 
Maurice Blik studied at Hornsey College of Art (National Diploma in Sculpture, 1960), followed by an Art Teacher’s Certificate, University of London (1969), and has enjoyed a successful career as a sculptor, both in the UK and the USA since his first one-man exhibition at Alwin Gallery, London (1985). Since 2008 he has been represented by Bowman Sculpture, London, through whom his work is exhibited at major international art fairs.

Noteworthy past exhibitions include: one-man exhibition at Alwin Gallery, London (1985); Royal Academy Summer Exhibition (1991, 1993, 1997, 1998); one-man exhibition at Blain’s Fine Art, London (1999); one-man exhibition at The Royal British Society of Sculptors, London (2008).

He was awarded resident status by the USA Government in 1992 under the category ‘person of extraordinary artistic ability’, and was elected President of the Royal British Society of Sculptors(1996-1997), and a Fellow of the Royal Society of Arts (1997).

Film and television 
Blik has been the subject of films and documentaries: ‘The Art of Remembering’ BBC, directed by Tim Robinson (1998); performance film ‘Second Breath’ directed by Gillian Lacey (2007), ‘Hollow Dog’(2017) and 'The Last Survivors' BBC, directed by Arthur Cary (2019)

Sculpture works 
Blik has a number of public sculptures in the UK and USA, including ‘Renaissance’, East India Docks, London (1995); ‘Behold’ Middlesex University, UK (2000); ’Splishsplash’, Vanderbilt University Medical Center, Nashville, USA (2005);‘Second Breath’, Chandler Hospital, University of Kentucky, USA (2011); ‘Every Which Way’, National Memorial Arboretum, Staffordshire, UK (2017).

Gallery

References 

Living people
1939 births
British male sculptors
21st-century British sculptors
21st-century male artists
20th-century British sculptors
Dutch male sculptors
20th-century Dutch sculptors
21st-century Dutch sculptors
Artists from Amsterdam
Dutch emigrants to the United Kingdom
Alumni of the University of London
Bergen-Belsen concentration camp survivors
20th-century British male artists
21st-century British male artists
20th-century Dutch male artists